HP-17B is an algebraic entry financial and business calculator manufactured by Hewlett-Packard, introduced on 4 January 1988 along with the HP-19B, HP-27S and the HP-28S. It was a simplified business model, like the 19B. There were two versions, the US one working in English only, and the international one with a choice of six languages (English, German, Spanish, French, Italian, and Portuguese).

HP-17B 
HP-17B code name was Trader and it belonged to the Pioneer series of Hewlett-Packard calculators. It had a 131x16 LCD dot matrix, 22x2 characters, menu-driven display, used a Saturn processor and had a memory of 8000 bytes, of which 6750 bytes were available to the user for variable and equation storage. The HP-17B had a clock with alarm that allowed for basic agenda capabilities, as well an infrared port for printing to some Hewlett-Packard infrared printers.

HP 17BII 
The 17B was replaced by the HP 17BII (F1638A) (code name Trader II) in January 1990, which added RPN entry.

HP 17bII+ 
The 17BII was replaced by the HP 17bII+ in 2003. Two significantly different case variants of the 17bII+ exist. The newer 17bII+ (F2234A), introduced in 2007, with Sunplus Technology SPLB31A CPU was developed and is manufactured by Kinpo Electronics.

References

External links
HP page of Christoph Gießelink scripts for the HP-17B and more
 

17B
17B
Sunplus